John Ellis Martineau (December 2, 1873 – March 6, 1937) was the 28th governor of Arkansas and was a United States district judge of the United States District Court for the Eastern District of Arkansas. His term as Governor was marked by the Great Mississippi Flood of 1927, with Martineau serving as President of the Tri-State Flood Commission.

Education and career

Born on December 2, 1873, in Clay County, Missouri, to Sarah Hetty Lamb and Gregory Martineau, a farmer recently arrived from Quebec, Canada, Martineau received an Artium Baccalaureus degree in 1896 from the Arkansas Industrial University (now the University of Arkansas) and a Bachelor of Laws in 1899 from the University of Arkansas School of Law. He entered private practice in Little Rock, Arkansas starting in 1899. He was a member of the Arkansas House of Representatives from 1903 to 1905. He was a Chancellor for the Arkansas Chancery Court for the First Chancery District from 1907 to 1927.

Grant of habeas corpus

While serving on the chancery court, Martineau issued a writ of habeas corpus for defendants in the criminal prosecutions arising out of the Elaine Race Riot in Phillips County in eastern Arkansas. Although the Arkansas Supreme Court later vacated that order, it allowed the defendants enough time to avoid execution and to seek habeas corpus relief in federal court. Their guilty verdicts were eventually reversed by the United States Supreme Court in its decision in Moore v. Dempsey.

Gubernatorial service

Martineau ran unsuccessfully for Governor of Arkansas in the 1924 Democratic primary. In 1926, he unseated in the primary the one-term incumbent Tom Jefferson Terral and then defeated in the general election the Republican attorney Drew Bowers, originally from Pocahontas in Randolph County, in northeastern Arkansas. Martineau received 76.5 percent of the vote to Bowers's 23.6 percent. Bowers was an Assistant United States Attorney for the Eastern District of Arkansas in both the Coolidge and Eisenhower administrations. Martineau left office early to accept a federal judgeship.

Achievements as governor

Martineau was the first Governor of Arkansas to broadcast his inaugural address on radio. The Martineau administration established a Confederate pensions board and authorized state aid to cities for highway construction through the Martineau Road Plan. Martineau was forced to deal with a major crisis when the Mississippi River broke free of its banks and covered 13 percent of the state during the Great Mississippi Flood of 1927. Martineau was named President of the Tri-State Flood Commission. In May 1927, Martineau called out the National Guard in response to the lynching of an African-American prisoner by a mob of 2,000 to 5,000 people in Little Rock. Martineau earned the reputation of fairness, integrity, and as a progressive politician. His role in state politics and effective management of crisis situations further secured his reputation as one of Arkansas better governors and brought him national attention.

Federal judicial service

Martineau was nominated by President Calvin Coolidge on March 2, 1928, to a seat on the United States District Court for the Eastern District of Arkansas vacated by Judge Jacob Trieber. He was confirmed by the United States Senate on March 2, 1928, and received his commission the same day. His service terminated on March 6, 1937, due to his death. He was interred in Roselawn Memorial Park in Little Rock.

Memberships

Martineau was a member of the secret society, Knights of Pythias, and the fraternal organization of the Freemasons Martineau is an 1894 initiate of the Kappa Sigma - Xi chapter at the University of Arkansas.  Contemporaries of Martineau at Xi Chapter included future State Senator and acting Arkansas Governor Xenophon Overton Pindall, future acting Governor Michael Pleasant Huddleston, future Federal Judge Thomas Clark Trimble III, and future Congressman and Federal Judge Samuel Billingsley Hill.

See also

 List of governors of Arkansas
 Moore v. Dempsey

References

External links
 Encyclopedia of Arkansas History & Culture entry: John Ellis Martineau

1873 births
1937 deaths
People from Clay County, Missouri
Politicians from Little Rock, Arkansas
Democratic Party governors of Arkansas
Democratic Party members of the Arkansas House of Representatives
Judges of the United States District Court for the Eastern District of Arkansas
United States district court judges appointed by Calvin Coolidge
20th-century American judges
University of Arkansas School of Law alumni
Lawyers from Little Rock, Arkansas